Dankmarshausen is a village and former municipality in the Wartburgkreis district of Thuringia, Germany. Since 1 January 2019, it has been part of the town of Werra-Suhl-Tal.

References

Wartburgkreis
Grand Duchy of Saxe-Weimar-Eisenach
Former municipalities in Thuringia